The 2018–19 NEC women's basketball season began with practices in October 2018, followed by the start of the 2018–19 NCAA Division I women's basketball season in November. Conference play started in January 2019 and concluded in March with the 2019 Northeast Conference women's basketball tournament.

Preseason

Rankings

() first place votes

Preseason All-NEC team
Source

Head coaches

Note: Stats shown are before the beginning of the season. All numbers are from time at current school.

NEC regular season

Player of the week
Throughout the regular season, the Northeast Conference offices named player(s) of the week and rookie(s) of the week.

Postseason

NEC tournament

 March 11–17, 2019, Northeast Conference Basketball Tournament.

All games will be played at the venue of the higher seed

NCAA tournament

National Invitational tournament

All-NEC honors and awards
Following the regular season, the conference selected outstanding performers based on a poll of league coaches.

See also
2018–19 Northeast Conference men's basketball season

References

External links
NEC website